VZW may refer to:

 Verizon Wireless, a mobile (cellular) telecommunications company
 Association without lucrative purpose, from the Belgian vereniging zonder winstoogmerk